N. floribunda may refer to:

 Neea floribunda, a New World plant
 Nemesia floribunda, a plant native to South Africa
 Nuxia floribunda, a tree native to Africa
 Nuytsia floribunda, a hemiparasitic plant